Patrick Boré (9 November 1956 – 5 July 2021) was a French politician who served as a Senator for Bouches-du-Rhône from 2020 until his death in 2021. A member of The Republicans (LR), he previously held the mayorship of La Ciotat from 2001 to 2020 and a seat in the Departmental Council of Bouches-du-Rhône from 2004 to 2020, elected in the canton of La Ciotat. Under Departmental Council President Martine Vassal, Boré served a first vice president in charge of international and European affairs from 2015 to 2020. He died from cancer at the age of 64. He was a pharmacist by occupation.

References

1956 births
2021 deaths
People from Toulon
Politicians from Provence-Alpes-Côte d'Azur
French Senators of the Fifth Republic
Senators of Bouches-du-Rhône
Rally for the Republic politicians
Union for a Popular Movement politicians
The Republicans (France) politicians
Mayors of places in Provence-Alpes-Côte d'Azur
Departmental councillors (France)
Deaths from cancer in France
Deaths from pancreatic cancer